Richard Flynn or Dick Flynn may refer to:

 Dick Flynn (American football), American football player and coach
 Dick Flynn (Australian footballer), Australian rules footballer 
 Richard Flynn (sound engineer), New Zealand-British sound engineer
 Richard Flynn (sport shooter), Irish sport shooter
 Richard M. Flynn, chairman of the New York Power Authority, namesake of the Richard M. Flynn Power Plant